Albert Edwin Miles (1903 — after 1930) was a Welsh professional footballer who played as a forward. He made sixteen appearances in the Football League for Cardiff City.

References

1903 births
Date of death missing
Welsh footballers
Bridgend Town A.F.C. players
Mid Rhondda F.C. players
Luton Town F.C. players
Derby County F.C. players
Cardiff City F.C. players
Crystal Palace F.C. players
Association football forwards